This article lists firearm cartridges which have a caliber in the  range.

All measurements are in mm (in).

2 mm cartridges 
All dimensions are given in mm (in).

References

Pistol and rifle cartridges